The Memorial Times was a publication of Memorial University College prior to its successor, The Muse.

The Times, the first student newspaper of Memorial University, was started at least as early as November 28, 1936, in a bimonthly format. The periodical continued (with a gap from March 1937-November 30, 1945) until December 19, 1947, by which it had moved to a monthly edition.

Editors 

 Michael Harrington, Nov. 28, 1936.
 I. Newell, May 4, 1937.
 Al Taylor, Nov. 30-Dec. 18, 1945.
 Bill Summers, Mar. 20, 1946.
 F. W. Rowe, Aug. 14, 1946.
 Edison J. Lowe and John A. Ryan, Nov. 14-Dec. 19, 1947.

References

Memorial Times, The
Memorial Times, The
Memorial University of Newfoundland
Defunct newspapers published in Newfoundland and Labrador
Publications disestablished in 1947
Publications with year of establishment missing